Christian Traeumer (born March 25, 2000) is an American actor.  Beginning his professional acting career at the age of five, Traeumer is a Young Artist Award Best Leading Young Actor nominee for his role in the 2012 feature film The Child.

Biography
Christian Antonio Traeumer was born March 25, 2000 in San Jose, California. In 2004, he relocated to Los Angeles, California. 
In 2005, he booked his first commercial for a regional advertisement.

At the age of nine he was cast for a short film called “Redemption”.
Christian also has worked on shows such as “Your Kid ate What?” a real life reenactment show where he guest starred as Andrew Rivera. Dad Camp where he starred as himself as a nine-year-old boy who was raised without a Dad, showing the effects of being the product of a "single parent” and “Kidnap & Rescue” where he was the lead “Miko”.
At the age of ten he landed his first feature film role in the adaptation of the best selling novel by Rudolfo Anaya “Bless Me, Ultima” where he played “Bones” to be released in 2011.

Less than six months later he was boarding a plane to Berlin, Germany to play the lead role of “Simon Sachs” a terminally ill brain tumor patient who believes he is a serial killer in a past life in the adaptation of the best selling novel “Das Kind” (The Child) written by Sebastian Fitzek with a release date of October 2012 .
Christian starred with Eric Roberts, Sunny Mabrey, Ben Becker and Peter Greene.

Christian has studied at the conservatory of fine arts at Cal State University Los Angeles, and soon the Performing arts Magnet at Miliken school in Sherman Oaks, California.

Filmography

References

External links
 
 
 Christian Traeumer German interview in Potsdam, Germany
 Das Kind "The Child official movie website

2000 births
Living people
21st-century American male actors
American male film actors
American male child actors
American male television actors
Male actors from California